Ellison Goodall Bishop (born October 12, 1954) is an American former long-distance runner. She twice represented the United States at the IAAF World Cross Country Championships, winning a bronze medal and leading the American women to team gold at the 1979 edition, then sharing in a team bronze medal in 1980.

She attended Duke University and won All-American honours for the Duke Blue Devils in both track and cross country. She was the second woman to be inducted into Duke University athletic hall of fame. She later appeared in a documentary on former Duke track coach Al Buehler, Starting at the Finish Line: The Coach Buehler Story.

Goodall was only the second ever women's champion in the 10,000-meter run at the USA Outdoor Track and Field Championships, succeeding Peg Neppel to take the title in 1978.

Her half marathon winning time of 1:15:01 at a race in Winston-Salem, North Carolina was a world record for several months, taking the best mark from Miki Gorman before Kathy Mintie broke the record that same year. On the professional road running circuit she was the 1979 winner of the Falmouth Road Race, won the 1982 Boston Milk Run, and placed sixth at the 1980 Boston Marathon with a time of 2:42:23 hours.

International competitions

National titles
USA Outdoor Track and Field Championships
10,000-meter run: 1978

References

External links

Living people
1954 births
American female long-distance runners
American female marathon runners
Duke Blue Devils women's track and field athletes
World record setters in athletics (track and field)
Duke Blue Devils women's cross country runners
20th-century American women